The Bachelor's Club is a 1929 American independent comedy film directed by Noel M. Smith and starring Richard Talmadge, Barbara Worth and  Edna Murphy.

Plot

Cast
 Richard Talmadge as 	Dick Butler
 Barbara Worth as Dot Arnold
 Edna Murphy as Gussie
 Edna Ellsmere 
 V. Talbot Henderson
 Herbert Heyes 
 Barry Palmer 
 Josef Swickard

References

Bibliography
 Connelly, Robert B. The Silents: Silent Feature Films, 1910-36, Volume 40, Issue 2. December Press, 1998.
 Melnick, Ross. American Showman: Samuel "Roxy" Rothafel and the Birth of the Entertainment Industry, 1908-1935. Columbia University Press, 2014. 
 Munden, Kenneth White. The American Film Institute Catalog of Motion Pictures Produced in the United States, Part 1. University of California Press, 1997.

External links
 

1929 films
1929 comedy films
1920s English-language films
American silent feature films
Silent American comedy films
American black-and-white films
Fox Film films
Films directed by Noel M. Smith
1920s American films